EXEC I is a discontinued UNIVAC's original operating system developed for the UNIVAC 1107 in 1962.  EXEC I is a batch processing operating system that supports multiprogramming.

See also
UNIVAC EXEC II
List of UNIVAC products
History of computing hardware

References

External links

EXEC 1